Yavne or Yavneh is a city in the Central District of Israel. In many English translations of the Bible, it is known as Jabneh .

Yavne holds a special place in Jewish history because of its contribution to Judaism's recovery and reconstitution under sages ben Zakkai and Gamaliel II following the destruction of the Second Temple. This period, sometimes known as the "Yavne period", became a crucial mark in the development of Rabbinic Judaism. The city has a history of producing wine throughout much of antiquity, as indicated by both archeological findings and ancient sources. In Greek and Latin-speaking sources, it was known as Jamnia ( Iamníā).

Under Late Roman and Byzantine rule, it had a mixed population of Christians, Jews, and Samaritans.  Under the Crusaders, the city was known as Ibelin, and was where the House of Ibelin resided. During the Ottoman and British periods, it was known as Yibna. The ancient site is now found in the Tel Yavne archeological site, which is southeast of the modern city.

History

Tel Yavne

Excavations were carried out on the ancient tell (mound created by accumulation of archaeological remains) known as Tel Yavne (Hebrew), which developed on a natural kurkar hill. The tell was inhabited, possibly continuously, from either the Bronze or Iron Age until the British Mandate period. During some periods, especially the Byzantine period, the settlement expanded to cover part of the plain and hills surrounding the tell. Yavne is mentioned in the Hebrew Bible and it is documented in written sources and through archaeological excavations on the main tell and the adjacent "Temple Hill" throughout the ages.

In Roman times, the city was known as Iamnia, also spelled Jamnia. It was bequeathed by King Herod upon his death to his sister Salome. Upon her death it passed to Emperor Augustus, who managed it as a private imperial estate, a status it was to maintain for at least a century. After Salome's death, Iamnia came into the property of Livia, the future Roman empress, and then to her son Tiberius.

During the First Jewish–Roman War, when the Roman army had quelled the insurrection in Galilee, the army then marched upon Iamnia and Azotus, taking both towns and stationing garrisons within them. According to rabbinic tradition, Rabbi Yohanan ben Zakkai and his disciples were permitted to settle in Iamnia during the outbreak of the war, after Zakkai, realizing that Jerusalem was about to fall, sneaked out of the city and asked Vespasian, the commander of the besieging Roman forces, for the right to settle in Yavne and teach his disciples. Upon the fall of Jerusalem, his school functioned as a re-establishment of the Sanhedrin. It is also rumored to have been the site of a purported council that established the Rabbinic Jewish biblical canon.

When disputes were rampant in Israel regarding basic halakhic norms, it was in Yavne, according to the Jerusalem Talmud (Berakhot 1:4), that a Divine voice (Hebrew: bat ḳol) was heard declaring that, while both schools of thought espoused to the words of the Living God, the Halacha, in practical matters, is in accordance with the School of Hillel. To counter a perceived threat to the emerging rabbinical authority posed by heterogeneous groups of Jews who embraced ideas that were thought to be unacceptable by the assembly, Talmudic tradition has it that it was in Yavne where Samuel the Less, during the days of Rabban Gamliel II, enacted the "twelfth benediction" in the daily prayer, known as the benediction against apostates and heretics (Hebrew: minim).

The Islamic historian al-Baladhuri (died 892 CE) mentioned Yibna as one of ten towns in Jund Filastin conquered by the Rashidun army led by 'Amr ibn al-'As in the early 7th century.

The Crusaders called the city Ibelin and built its castle there in 1141. An excavation led by Professor Dan Bahat in 2005 revealed the main gate. Its namesake noble family, the House of Ibelin, was important in the Kingdom of Jerusalem and later in the Kingdom of Cyprus. Salvage excavations at the west of the tell unearthed a stash of 53 Crusader coins of the 12th and 13th centuries.

Ibelin was first sacked by Saladin before his army was comprehensively routed at the Battle of Montgisard in late 1177. In August 1187, Yavne was retaken and burnt to the ground, and ceased for some time to form part of the Crusaders' kingdom. Ibelin's parish church was transformed into a mosque, to which a minaret was added during the Mamluk period in 1337. The minaret survives until today, while the mosque (the former Crusader church) was blown up by the IDF in 1950.

The Mausoleum of Abu Huraira, known in Arabic as Maqam Abu Hurayra, described as "one of the finest domed mausoleums in Palestine", is located in Yavne. Since the 12th century, it has been known as the tomb of Abu Hurairah, a companion (sahaba) of the Islamic prophet Muhammad. Abu Hurairah however is buried in Medina, Saudi Arabia, but he was also venerated in various places in Palestine, namely in Ramle and Yavne. After 1948 the shrine has been adopted by Jews who came primarily from Arab countries and believe that the tomb is the burial place of Rabbi Gamaliel of Yavne. The Jewish claimants to the site say that it was originally a Jewish sacred burial place and was Islamized later, but there is no record of Jewish pilgrimage there in the decades before 1948.

In mid-March 1948, a contingent of Iraqi soldiers moved into the village. In a Haganah reprisal on 30 March, two dozen villagers were killed. On April 21, the Iraqi village commander was arrested in Jaffa for drunkenly shooting two Arabs.

During the 1948 Arab–Israeli War, residents of Zarnuqa sought refuge in Yibna, but left after the villagers accused them of being traitors.

On 27 May, following the fall of Al-Qubayba and Zarnuqa, most of the population of Yibna fled to Isdud, but armed males were refused entry. On 5 June, when Israeli troops arrived, they found the village almost deserted apart from a few old people who were ordered to leave.

Yavne Yam

The ancient harbour of Yavne has been identified on the coast at Minet Rubin (Arabic) or Yavne-Yam (Hebrew), where excavations have revealed fortification going back to the Bronze Age Hyksos. It was in use from the Middle Bronze Age until the 12th century CE, when it was abandoned.  refers to the burning of the harbour and its fleet on the direction of Judas Maccabeus.

Foundation of modern Yavne

Yavne was established in October 1948 as a transition camp for Jews from Arab countries, Iran and Europe. The first built neighbourhood was established in early 1949. In the early years, Yavne was a poor town, with the inhabitants subsisting on small-scale trade, as farm and industry laborers, and on agriculture in their yards. The town had a population of 1,600 in 1953. The town gradually developed. In the 1960s, several enterprises moved from Tel Aviv to Yavne, and industries in the city came to include leather, textiles, and metallurgy. The population had grown to 10,100 in 1970.

After 1948, a number of other Israeli villages were founded on Yibna land: Kfar HaNagid and Beit Gamliel in 1949, Ben Zakai in 1950, Kfar Aviv (originally: "Kfar HaYeor") in 1951, Tzofiyya in 1955. According to Walid Khalidi, a railroad crosses the village. The old mosque and minaret, together with a shrine can still be seen, and some of the old houses are inhabited by Jewish and Arab families.

The 1980 edition of a popular guidebook published in Jerusalem describes Yavne as having Israel's first atomic reactor. An image of which appeared on a 0.50 Shekel stamp.

Yavne was a stagnant backwater city until the mid-1970s, when Mayor Meir Sheetrit, who assumed office in 1974, began to develop the city as a low-density suburban satellite of Tel Aviv by building homes targeted at middle-class families who could commute to Tel Aviv while living in Yavne and improving the school system. Yavne rapidly developed as a result and was granted city status in 1986. By the mid-1990s, the population had risen to 25,600.

Archaeology
Tel Yavne was first excavated in 2005 in a dig headed by Dan Bahat, who unearthed the gate room of the Crusader castle of Ibelin, as well as a vault destroyed with gunpowder by the Mamluks and deeply embedded Crusader walls east of it, all at or around the top of the tell.

In December 2019, a large number of pottery kilns and 1,200-year-old gold coins which may have been a local potter's "piggy bank" were unearthed in a juglet by the Israeli Antiquities Authority. According to archaeologist Robert Kool, the coins date back to the early Abbasid period, about 9th century CE. One of the seven coins was minted by Caliph Harun al-Rashid (786–809 CE). "These are gold dinars issued by the Aghlabid dynasty that ruled in North Africa. Without a doubt this is a wonderful Hanukkah present for us," said Kool. In August 2020, Israeli archaeologists discovered 425 complete gold coins, most dating to the Abbasid period around 1,100 years ago. In April 2021, archaeologists announced the discovery of a 1,600-year-old multicolored mosaic dated back to the Byzantine period in an industrial area. According to IAA archaeologist Elie Haddad, it was the first time that excavators revealed a colored mosaic floor in Yavne.

In 2022, a sling bullet was discovered with the Greek inscription "Victory of Heracles and Hauronas", the two gods were the patrons of the city during the Hellenistic period.

Demography

According to the Israel Central Bureau of Statistics (CBS), in 2001 the ethnic makeup of the city was Jewish and others, without significant Arab population.  As of March 2018 the city numbered 46,705 persons, with a high percentage of young people: 36% of the population was in the 0–21 age group and 64% of the total population was younger than 39.

According to CBS figures for 2001, there were 16 schools and 7,445 students in Yavne (11 elementary schools with 4,037 students and 9 high schools with 3,408 students). 59.6% of 12th graders were entitled to a matriculation certificate that year.

Economy
Major companies based in Yavne include Ormat Industries, Aeronautics Defense Systems, Avisar and Orbotech.
In 2019, Merck established an incubator in Yavne with a budget of about €20 million over three years that will invest in startups focusing on semiconductor and display crystal technologies. In 2022 Recipharm established a new facility in Yavne.

Environmental issues
In 2012 a new green neighborhood "Neot Rabin" was inaugurated in the south of the city.

Sports

Maccabi Yavne is the city's major football club. During the 1980s the club played in the top division and in 1985 won the Toto Cup. Today they are in Liga Leumit. The basketball team, Elitzur Yavne, have also played in the Liga Leumit (basketball) since 2007.

Omri Casspi, the first Israeli to play in the National Basketball Association, grew up in the city and played for some of its teams.

Notable people

 Avior Byron (born 1973), singer, songwriter, and musicologist
 Omri Casspi (born 1988), Israeli professional NBA basketball player
 Itai Chammah (born 1985), Olympic swimmer
 Gil Dor, guitar player
 Elishay Kadir (born 1987), basketball player
 Uri Kokia (born 1981), basketball player and coach
 Shlomi Koriat (born 1976), actor and comedian
 Maor Melikson, footballer
 Nevo Mizrahi (born 1987), footballer 
 Mushail Mushailov, artist
 Ido Nehoshtan, Major-General (ret.), former chief of Israeli Air Force
 Shabak Samech, rap and hip-hop group
 Meir Sheetrit (born 1948), Israeli Minister of the Interior

Sister cities
Yavne is twinned with:
 Le Raincy, France
 Speyer, Germany
 Sunrise, Florida, United States

See also
Archaeology of Israel
Economy of Israel
Yavne-Yam

References

External links

Municipal website

Yavneh Yields Over a Hundred Philistine Cult Stands  Biblical Archaeology Review

2008 salvage excavation report, Orit Segal at Excavations and Surveys in Israel, 5 July 2011. Accessed 22 Feb 2017.

 
Cities in Central District (Israel)
Cities in Israel
Development towns
Hebrew Bible cities
Talmud places
Ancient Jewish settlements of Judaea
Canaanite cities
Tells (archaeology)
1949 establishments in Israel